Freedom Arms is a Freedom, Wyoming based firearm manufacturing company, known for producing powerful single-action revolvers.  The company was founded in 1978 by Wayne Baker and Dick Casull to produce the Mini revolver then later a revolver chambered in Casull's powerful .454 Casull chambering.  This 5-shot revolver was the Model 83.  Freedom Arms currently makes a single-shot pistol in addition to their revolvers.

Models
Freedom Arms' first offering was a 5-shot mini revolver in .22 LR known as "The Patriot".  It was later offered in .22 Short and .22 WMR.  A beltbuckle holster version was patented by Richard J. "Dick" Casull to accommodate the small revolver. A Boot Pistol model was available with a longer barrel. A 4-shot mini revolver was also produced by Freedom Arms. Production of mini-revolvers by Freedom Arms ceased in 1990.  The mini-revolver design was sold to North American Arms.

Co-founder Dick Casull had been experimenting with several prototype rounds since 1956.  Casull felt he could offer a more powerful version of the .45 Colt and .44 Remington Magnum and built a number of 5-shot prototypes on Ruger Super Blackhawk frames.  Freedom Arms was the first commercial producer for revolvers chambered in this caliber, the .454 Casull, in 1983. This model is still manufactured today as the Model 83.

A number of variants upon the Model 83 have been produced, all with five-shot cylinders. The first was a .45 Colt in February 1986 (54 examples sold 1986–1989, serial numbers E7201-E7254), followed closely by a .44 Magnum version. In 1991, Freedom Arms introduced the Model 252 in .22 long rifle and in 1992 the model 353 in .357 Magnum, including a 9-inch variation produced to meet the 4lb maximum weight requirement for IHMSA Silhouette competition. In 1993 the Model 555 was introduced in .50 Action Express. .41 Magnum and .475 Linebaugh chamberings were introduced in 1997 and 1999 respectively. Freedom Arms introduced their own .500 Wyoming Express in the Model 83 .500 WE in 2005.

At least two variants of the Model 83 with a 3-inch barrel and lacking any ejector were produced in .454 and .44 Magnum. These variants, named "Marshall" (Unknown production) and "Packer" (200 produced - 12 in 44 Magnum), have symmetrical frames, made possible by the lack of the ejector.

The Model 97 design, with a smaller frame than the Model 83, was introduced in 1997, originally with a six-shot .357 Magnum cylinder (.38 Special cylinder available). A five-shot .45 Colt chambering was introduced the following year, as was a five-shot .41 Magnum in 2000. Six-shot .22s are produced with .22LR sporting and match grade cylinders available, as well as .22 Magnum, from 2003. A five-shot .44 Special chambering came in 2004. In 2009, Freedom Arms announced the .224-32 FA and began producing a six-shot in this chambering.

The Model 2008, introduced in 2010, is a single-shot pistol with interchangeable barrels, most in rifle chamberings.

Proprietary Cartridges

.224-32 FA 
The .224-32 FA is a wildcat cartridge designed in 2009 by Freedom Arms for use in their Model 97 revolver. The .224-32 FA was designed to provide a high-performance .22 caliber centerfire cartridge that would work in a revolver, and is capable of taking varmints and predators up to the size of coyotes.

References

External links
 

Firearm manufacturers of the United States
Manufacturing companies based in Wyoming
Manufacturing companies established in 1978
Derringers